Window Maker is a free and open-source window manager for the X Window System, allowing graphical applications to be run on Unix-like operating-systems. It is designed to emulate NeXTSTEP's GUI as an OpenStep-compatible environment. Window Maker is part of the GNU Project.

Overview 
Window Maker has been characterized as reproducing "the elegant look and feel of the NeXTSTEP GUI" and is noted as "easy to configure and easy to use." A graphical tool called Wprefs is included and can be used to configure most aspects of the UI. The interface tends towards a minimalist, high performance environment directly supporting XPM, PNG, JPEG, TIFF, GIF and PPM icons with an alpha-channel and a right-click, sliding-scrolling application menu system which can throw off pinnable menus, along with window-icon miniaturization and other animations on multiple desktops. Menus and preferences can be changed without restarting. As with most window managers it supports themes and many are available. Owing to its NeXT inspiration, Window Maker has a dock like macOS, but Window Maker's look and feel hews mostly to that of its NeXT forebear.

Architecture 
Window Maker has window hints which allow seamless integration with the GNUstep, GNOME, KDE, Motif and OpenLook environments. Significantly it has almost complete ICCCM compliance and internationalization support for at least 11 locales. Window Maker uses the lightweight WINGs widget set which was built specifically for Window Maker as a way to skirt what its developers said would have been the "overkill" (or bloat) of using GNUstep. WINGs is common to other applications including a login display manager called WINGs Display Manager (WDM) and many dockapps. Window Maker dock and clip applets are compatible with those from AfterStep's wharf.

History 
Window Maker was written from scratch primarily by Brazilian programmer Alfredo Kojima as a window manager for the GNUstep desktop environment and originally meant as an improved take on the AfterStep window manager's design concept. The first release was in 1997. For a time it was included as a standard window manager in several Linux distributions and is also available in the FreeBSD and OpenBSD ports collection. Since the goal of the project has been to closely emulate the design of the defunct NeXTstep and OpenStep GUIs, further development has been light. In late 2007 the widely available, stable release version was at 0.92 from July 2005 with subsequent maintenance updates having been made to some distribution packages and ports.

In late June 2008 a post on the project's website said active development would resume, noting, "...we are working very hard to revitalize Window Maker's presence on X Window (and perhaps beyond) desktops... We expect to once again provide the de-facto minimalist yet extremely functional window manager to the world."  On 29 January 2012, Window Maker 0.95.1 was released, making it the first official release in almost seven years. This was followed by a number of releases;  the latest release was 0.95.9, released on 4 April 2020.

Name 
The program's original name was WindowMaker (camel cased and without the space) but a naming conflict arose with an older product called Windowmaker from Windowmaker Software Ltd, a UK company producing software for companies that manufacture windows and doors. A 1998 agreement between the developers of Window Maker and Windowmaker Software specified that Window Maker (in the X sense) should never be used as a single word.

Usage 
Adhering closely to the NeXT interface, the default appearance can be confusing to someone expecting a Microsoft Windows-style taskbar and start menu. All applications can be accessed by right-clicking on the desktop background to access the fully configurable main menu.

Window Maker can be configured by double-clicking the screwdriver icon on the dock. An icon depicting a computer monitor is used to launch a command-window and a paperclip icon is used to cycle between workspaces. Any icon in Window Maker, including application icons, can be easily changed.

Icons representing running applications appear at the bottom of the screen (the user can extend application windows to cover these). By default, the dock appears at upper right. Icons can be dragged onto the dock to make them permanent. The edge of an icon can be right-clicked to adjust its settings. A separate, dockable application called wmdrawer features a slide-out drawer which can hold application and file launching icons.

Basic apps 

While any X application can be docked in Window Maker, the archetypical WM dockable applications are called dockapps. These tend to be clocks and system monitoring applications. There are many clock implementations, including wmcalclock, wmclock (a NeXTStep-like calendar clock clone) and wmclockmon. Many other dockapps are available, typically ones intended to interact with other "full fledged" applications.

The WPrefs configuration tool enables tuning of most Window Maker preferences. wmakerconf was developed to provide more configuration options, notably theme customization. Configuration files are typically stored in ~/GNUstep/. The background can be changed from the command line with wmsetbg -s -u [filename.jpg] (wmsetbg stands for "window maker set background").

FSViewer is a separate, configurable Miller Columns file browser developed for Window Maker in 1998 by George Clernon as a visual and functional analogy to NeXTstep's Workspace Manager. In 2002, it was adapted to later versions of the WINGs libraries and Window Maker by Guido Scholz.

aterm is an rxvt based terminal emulator developed for Afterstep mainly for visual appeal, featuring a NeXTstep style scrollbar (which matches Window Maker's look and feel) along with pseudo-transparency.

Menu 
The application menu can be edited graphically with much versatility. The configuration is recorded in ~/GNUstep/Defaults/WMRootMenu as a text file which can be easily read and edited (in versions after 0.94.0 it can also be automatically generated from a list of installed applications using a program called wmgenmenu).

Menu items can be set to:
Launch a program or application with or without a filename and other arguments
Launch a command line interface with or without further arguments
Run a WM command, such as exiting a Window Maker session or listing windows and workspaces
List a submenu containing any of the above tasks

Many Linux distributions define their own applications menu for Window Maker. This cannot usually be edited using the configuration tool (which will instead offer to replace it with a generic default menu which can be edited).

Mascot

Amanda the Panda is the mascot of Window Maker. She was designed by Agnieszka Czajkowska.

See also 
 Extended Window Manager Hints
 List of computing mascots
 :Category:Computing mascots

References

External links 
 Window Maker Mailing Lists
 Window Maker Live, an installable Debian/Wheezy based Linux Live CD using Window Maker as default graphical interface
 "WINGsman", WINGs documentation

1997 software
Free X window managers
GNU Project software
GNUstep